Babin  is a village in the administrative district of Gmina Bełżyce, within Lublin County, Lublin Voivodeship, in eastern Poland. The village has a population of 830.

A large skirmish took place near the village during the November Uprising (17 April 1831).

References

Villages in Lublin County